may refer to either of the following Japanese emperors:

Emperor Kōtoku (645–654), 36th emperor
Emperor Monmu (697–707), 42nd emperor